Nicoline Artursson (born 1993) is a Swedish fashion model and Miss World Sweden titleholder. Artursson represented Sweden in Miss World 2011 on November 6 in London. Nicoline Artursson was born in the village of Villshärad outside Halmstad. Artursson speaks French after living in Paris, France for a year modelling for the clothing company Abercrombie & Fitch located on Champs-Élysées. Artursson was also offered to be the Bachelorette in the French version of the television reality series The Bachelorette, but declined as she had to finish her studies back in Sweden.

In 2018, Artursson was a contestant on Robinson: Fiji which is broadcast on TV4.

References

External links
Official Miss World Sweden blog

1993 births
Living people
People from Halmstad Municipality
Miss World 2011 delegates
Swedish beauty pageant winners
Swedish female models